Durg district is a district situated in Chhattisgarh, India. The district headquarters is Durg.  The district covers an area of 2,238 km². As of 2011 it is the second most populous district of Chhattisgarh (out of 18), after Raipur.

The district is home to two important religious sites. The principal Hindu temple, the Ganga Maiyaat Jhalmala, Jain shrine of Uwasaggaharam Parshwa Teerth at Nagpura (near Durg), attract pilgrims from all over India. The Langurveer Mandir is one and only Hindu Temple Devoted to God Langoorveer in India situated in Durg.

The town of Bhilai is home to the Bhilai Steel Plant.

The present collector of Durg is Pushpendra Kumar Meena.

Geography

Durg is surrounded by the following districts:

1. Bemetara to the north

2. Balod to the south.

3. Raipur to the east.

4. Dhamtari to the south east

5. Rajnandgaon to the west.

Municipal corporation
Bhilai Charoda Municipal Corporation
Bhilai Municipal Corporation
Durg Municipal Corporation
Risali Municipal Corporation

Municipal council
Jamul
Ahiwara
Kumhari

Nagar panchayat
Patan
Dhamdha
Utai

Cities in Durg
Durg
Bhilai

Towns in Durg
Anda
Dhamdha
Jamul
Kumhari
Mahamaya
Patan

Demographics

According to the 2011 census, Durg district has a population of 3,343,872, roughly equal to the nation of Uruguay or the US state of Connecticut. This gives it a ranking of 100th in India (out of a total of 640). Its population growth rate over the decade 2001-2011 was 18.95%. Durg has a sex ratio of 988 females for every 1,000 males, and a literacy rate of 79.69%. After bifurcation, the district had a population of 1,721,948. 1,104,700 (64.15%) live in urban areas. Scheduled Castes and Scheduled Tribes made up 14.26% and 5.88% of the population respectively.

Languages

At the time of the 2011 Census of India, 58.89% of the population in the district spoke Chhattisgarhi, 25.02% Hindi, 2.82% Telugu, 2.68% Odia, 2.24% Marathi, 2.08% Bhojpuri, 1.29% Bengali and 1.25% Punjabi as their first language.

Vernaculars spoken include Chhattisgarhi and written in the Devanagari script.

References

External links
 
 Durg district gazetteer Hindi दुर्ग-दर्पण 

 
Districts of Chhattisgarh
2000 establishments in Chhattisgarh